Within a Song is a studio album by guitarist John Abercrombie's Quartet with saxophonist Joe Lovano, bassist Drew Gress, and drummer Joey Baron that was recorded in 2012 and released by ECM.

Reception

The Guardian 's review by John Fordham awarded the album 4 stars, stating, "this all-star group constantly demonstrate how joyous that can sound without winding up the volume". JazzTimes observed "in typical crystalline ECM fashion, Within a Song plays tricks with its role models, pushing envelopes that were elastic to begin with". John McBeath of The Australian  wrote, "This is a valuable collection by two old masters in a nostalgic, relaxed setting of expert craftsmanship". Stereophile correspondent Fred Kaplan noted, "Within a Song is something of a high-wire act: delicate music of an uninsistent intensity, a quiet swing, that hangs together or collapses on the ensemble's sustenance of balance".

Track listing

Personnel
 John Abercrombie – guitar
 Joe Lovano – tenor saxophone
 Drew Gress – double bass
 Joey Baron – drums

References

ECM Records albums
John Abercrombie (guitarist) albums
2012 albums
Albums produced by Manfred Eicher